Interleukin receptors are a family of cytokine receptors for interleukins. They belong to the immunoglobulin superfamily.

Types
There are two main families of Interleukin receptors, Type 1 and Type 2.

Type 1
Type 1 interleukin receptors include:

Type 2
Type 2 interleukin receptors are Type II cytokine receptors. They include:

Other
Interleukin-8 receptor, RANTES receptors (CCR1, CCR3, CCR5), MIP-1 receptor, PF4 receptor, M-CSF receptor and NAP-2 receptor belong to GPCR chemokine receptor family.

References

External links
 

Immunology
Single-pass transmembrane proteins